Pediasia ematheudellus is a moth in the family Crambidae. It was described by Joseph de Joannis in 1927. It is found in Mozambique and Madagascar.

References

Crambini
Moths described in 1927
Moths of Sub-Saharan Africa
Lepidoptera of Mozambique
Moths of Madagascar